Nicholas J. Antosca (born January 23, 1983) is an American film and television writer, producer, and novelist. He is the creator and showrunner of the horror anthology television series Channel Zero (2016–2018). He also co-created and showran the Hulu true crime limited series The Act (2019) and the Netflix horror drama limited series Brand New Cherry Flavor (2021).

Career
As a television writer, he created the Syfy horror anthology series Channel Zero and the Hulu crime anthology The Act. He also co-produced 13 episodes of the horror series Hannibal.

Antosca was in a screenwriting partnership for several years with novelist Ned Vizzini, who died in 2013.

In January 2020, Syfy greenlit Chucky, a TV series continuation of the Child's Play franchise from creator Don Mancini, with Antosca set to executive produce.

In November 2019, it was announced that Antosca would be credited as a co-creator, writer, executive producer alongside Lenore Zion in the Netflix horror drama limited series, Brand New Cherry Flavor. The series premiered on Friday August 13, 2021.

Antosca will serve as showrunner, writer, and executive producer on A Friend of the Family for Peacock.

Filmography

Television

Film writing credits
The Forest (2016)
Antlers (2021)

Bibliography
 Fires, novel (Impetus Press, 2006; re-released in 2011 by Civil Coping Mechanisms).
 Midnight Picnic, novella (Word Riot Press, 2009).
 The Obese, novella (Lazy Fascist Press, 2012).
 The Hangman's Ritual, novella (Civil Coping Mechanisms, 2013).
 The Girlfriend Game, short story collection (Word Riot Press, 2013).
 The Quiet Boy (Guernicamag.com, 2019).

Awards
 2009 Shirley Jackson Award for Best Novella: Midnight Picnic

References

External links

"Predator Bait" – short story from n+1
 Interview at The Short Form
 "Reigning Lecter: An Interview with Series Writer Nick Antosca on Hannibal"

1983 births
Living people
21st-century American male writers
21st-century American novelists
21st-century American screenwriters
American male novelists
American male screenwriters
American male television writers
American television producers
American television writers
Novelists from Louisiana
Screenwriters from Louisiana
Showrunners
Writers from New Orleans
Yale University alumni